Danish humanitarian aid to Norway during World War II, in Norway called  and in Denmark called , was initiated in 1941 and resulted in 32,000 tons of food supplies from Denmark to occupied Norway. 

The aid was instituted after the formation of Den norske damekomité in Copenhagen. Among the central organizers in Denmark were Carl and Borghild Hammerich.

A sculpture by Ørnulf Bast, Two Sisters or The Twin Sisters, expressing Norway's gratitude to Denmark, was unveiled in November 1949 at Oslo Plads in Copenhagen.

See also
Swedish humanitarian aid to Norway during World War II

References

Further reading

External links

Norway in World War II
Denmark in World War II
Humanitarian aid
Denmark–Norway relations